Doral Academy Preparatory High School is a public charter middle/high school located in Doral, Florida, United States. The school is supported by Academica, an education service provider.

Curriculum
The school offers twenty-nine Advanced Placement (AP) courses and several honors courses. Dual enrollment courses at Miami Dade College and Florida International University are available beginning in sophomore year. The goal of the Scholars Program is for students to simultaneously graduate with an Associates of Arts degree and a high school diploma. The school also offers a Pre-Advanced Placement program for selected middle school students.

In the 2016-2017 school year, an International Baccalaureate (IB) program was added to the school's curriculum. Doral Academy Charter is a school with an independently managed academic organization, approved and monitored by the local school board. Unlike private schools, which charge tuition fees, Doral Academy is funded by the Florida Department of Education and provides free education to any student eligible to attend public school in Miami-Dade County Public Schools.

Extracurricular activities
Doral Academy offers interscholastic sports for boys and girls at the high school and middle school level. The 2015-2016 Boys' swim team won the Class 3A state championship.

Clubs and honor societies at the school including the National Honor Society, Future Business Leaders of America, Mu Alpha Theta mathematics honor society, Model United Nations, and Key Club. Most of these clubs have been involved in competitions, and have been involved in helping out the community. At the 2017 Mu Alpha Theta National Convention, the Math Honor Society placed third in the country.

References

External links

 Doral Academy Preparatory High School

Middle schools in Miami-Dade County, Florida
Public high schools in Miami-Dade County, Florida
Public middle schools in Florida
Charter schools in Florida
Miami-Dade County Public Schools
Doral, Florida
1999 establishments in Florida
Educational institutions established in 1999